Zdzisław Stanisław Ambroziak (1 January 1944 – 23 January 2004) was a Polish volleyball player, sports journalist, sports commentator, a member of the Polish national team in 1963–1972, a participant at the Olympic Games (Mexico 1968, Munich 1972), three–time Polish Champion.

Personal life
Amroziak was born in Warsaw, he graduated from the Józef Piłsudski University of Physical Education in Warsaw. He was married to Ewa. In 1999, he appeared in the Polish movie, Kiler-ów 2-óch, starring as a sports commentator. He died after a long illness in a hospital in Warsaw.

Sporting achievements

Clubs
 National championships
 1964/1965  Polish Championship, with AZS AWF Warsaw
 1965/1966  Polish Championship, with AZS AWF Warsaw
 1967/1968  Polish Championship, with AZS AWF Warsaw

Memory
In 2007, was founded the Foundation of Zdzisław Ambroziak. The Foundation aims, among others, to support sports journalists attitude of fair play, and promote various forms of youth education. Since 2006, the tournament named Memoriał of Zdzisław Ambroziak, is organized for volleyball clubs to honor his memory.

External links
 Player profile at Olympic.org
 Player profile at Volleybox.net

1944 births
2004 deaths
Józef Piłsudski University of Physical Education in Warsaw alumni
Polish men's volleyball players
Volleyball players from Warsaw
Olympic volleyball players of Poland
Volleyball players at the 1968 Summer Olympics
Volleyball players at the 1972 Summer Olympics